Thailand Youth League is a tournament of Thai youth association football for development Thai football to compete in the international level and advance to FIFA World Cup, what are ones of government's policies. The tournament is under controlling from Sport Authority of Thailand (SAT) as a long-term project for 10 years at least for developing young Thai players continuously. From 2020 Thailand Youth League will move in the control of Football Association of Thailand.

Format 
Thailand Youth League holds 4 age-group tournaments, under-13, under-15, under-17, and under-19 all participate clubs will be divided into regions like Thai League 4. The tournament will be divided into 3 rounds as qualification round, regional league round, and championship round.

Champions history

Championship winners

Regional winners

External links 
 https://www.facebook.com/ThailandYouthLeague/?fref=ts
 http://www.thailandyouthleague.com/

References 

Football leagues in Thailand